The 2021 FIM CEV Moto2 European Championship was the twelfth CEV Moto2 season and the six under the FIM banner.

Calendar 
The calendar was published in November 2020. The round at Barcelona made a return for 2021.

Entry list

Championship standings 

 Scoring system

Points were awarded to the top fifteen finishers. A rider had to finish the race to earn points.

Riders' championship

Constructors' championship

References 

FIM CEV Moto2 European Championship
CEV
Motorcycle races